Bad Seed(s) or The Bad Seed(s) may refer to:

Films, television, and stage
 The Bad Seed, a 1954 novel by William March
 The Bad Seed (play), a 1954 play adaptation by Maxwell Anderson
 The Bad Seed (1956 film), a film adaptation of the play, directed by Mervyn LeRoy
 The Bad Seed (1985 film), a television adaptation of the play
 The Bad Seed (2018 film), a television adaptation, directed by and starring Rob Lowe
 Bad Seed, or Preston Tylk, a 2000 film by Jon Bokenkamp
 Bad Seeds (2016 film) (Les Mauvaises herbes), a Canadian film directed by Louis Bélanger
 Bad Seeds (2018 film) (Mauvaises herbes), a French film directed by Kheiron
 Bad Seeds (2021 film) (Mauvaises herbes), a Canadian short film directed by Claude Cloutier
 The Bad Seed (TV series), a 2019 New Zealand crime drama
 "Bad Seed" (CSI: Miami), a 2009 television episode
 "The Bad Seed" (Supernatural), a 2015 television episode

Literature
 The Bad Seed, a 2019 The Food Group children's book by Jory John
 Bad Seed, a biography of Nick Cave, by Ian Johnston

Music
 Nick Cave and the Bad Seeds, an Australian rock/post-punk band
 The Bad Seeds (American band), a 1960s garage rock band
 Bad Seed (Jan Howard album), 1966
 "Bad Seed" (Jan Howard song), 1966
 Mutiny/The Bad Seed, a 1983 album by the Birthday Party
 Bad Seed, a 2009 album by Boozed
 "Bad Seed", a 1997 song by Metallica from ReLoad
 "Bad Seed", a 2015 song by Ugly Kid Joe from Uglier Than They Used ta Be

See also
 Mauvaise Graine (lit. Bad Seed), a 1934 French drama film